Brighter Death Now is the artist name under which Roger Karmanik (b. 1965 as Roger Karlsson), the founder of the Swedish record label Cold Meat Industry, releases death industrial, power electronics and dark ambient music.

Whereas early Brighter Death Now recordings tended to be largely instrumental and atmospherically oriented, present-day releases often feature screamed vocals, distorted beyond comprehension. Throughout its history, Karmanik has kept his music's thematic elements focused on such topics as child molestation, sadism, and psychosis.

The Great Death trilogy and May All Be Dead have become rare collectors items, and are sought after by many Brighter Death Now fans. Roger Karmanik has been active under other names such as Lille Roger (Swedish for Little Roger) and Bomb The Daynursery.

In 2009, Karmanik remixed the short films of Jason LaRay Keener as projection for live shows.

Karmanik closed down Cold Meat Industries around the beginning of 2014 as he expressed that he was suffering mentally and physically from the stress of running the label. By the end of 2014, Karmanik had fully immersed himself within the shroud of Brighter Death Now and announced the creation of his new label Familjegraven whose sole purpose is to release his own projects, including rarities, reissues, and new recordings.

Discography

As Brighter Death Now

As Bomb The Daynursery

As Lille Roger

External links

 
 

Swedish musical groups
Ambient music groups
Power electronics musicians